Between 60 and 70 languages are spoken in the Solomon Islands Archipelago which covers a broader area than the nation state of Solomon Islands, and includes the island of Bougainville, which is an autonomous province of Papua New Guinea (PNG). The lingua franca of the archipelago is Pidgin, and the official language in both countries is English.

Language families 
Most of the languages in the Solomon Islands are Austronesian languages.

The Central Solomon languages such as Bilua, Lavukaleve,  Savosavo and Touo constitute an independent family within the Papuan languages.

Two other language families are represented on Bougainville, which is geographically part of the Solomon Islands, if not within the national boundaries.

The status of the Reefs – Santa Cruz languages were once thought to be non-Austronesian, but further research found them to be divergent Austronesian languages. The neighbouring languages of Vanikoro are also heavily relexified Austronesian languages.

An indigenous sign language, Rennellese Sign Language, has gone extinct.

Languages of the Solomon Islands archipelago

Italics indicate that a language is extinct.

Notes

Further reading
 

Data set derived from Tryon & Hackman (1983):  Greenhill, Simon, & Robert Forkel. (2019). lexibank/tryonsolomon: Solomon Islands Languages (Version v3.0). Zenodo.